The Siberian Chemical Combine was established in 1953 in Tomsk-7 now known as Seversk, in the Tomsk Region as a single complex of the nuclear technological cycle for the creation of nuclear weapons components based on fissile materials (highly enriched uranium and plutonium). It is a subsidiary of TVEL (Rosatom group).

History
The Siberian Chemical Combine played an important role in the Soviet Union's nuclear weapons program. The facility produced plutonium and highly enriched uranium (HEU), and fabricated warhead components using produced plutonium and HEU.

As the Cold War came to an end, the Siberian Chemical Combine's HEU production ceased and the last plutonium production nuclear reactor at the facility was shut down in 2008. The site had five reactors: EI-1 (1955), EI-2 (1958), ADE-3 (1961) and ADE-2 (1963). The ADE series of reactors also produced thermal and electrical energy, reaching electricity production of 600 MWe. All the reactors were decommissioned by 2023.

Although production has halted, the facility remains a major site for storage and handling of weapon-usable materials and nuclear weapon components.

Presently, the facility supplies Russia's low enriched uranium fuel needs and enriches reprocessed uranium for foreign customers. The facility is one of the largest sites that stores low and intermediate level nuclear wastes from reprocessing with more than 30 million cubic meters stored via deep-well injection.

Facilities

The complex is based on four plants:
Isotope separation plant (ZRI) - separates uranium isotopes with a low degree of 235-U enrichment. Operates since 1953. Until 1973, gas diffusion separation was carried out, and later - centrifugal separation. A number of stable isotopes of xenon, tin, selenium, etc. are also produced. 
Sublimation plant (NW) - processing of uranium-containing products, including highly enriched uranium for fuel elements and raw uranium hexafluoride for isotope enrichment. It was launched in 1954-1955. 
Radiochemical Plant (RHC) - processing of irradiated uranium blocks for the purpose of extraction of uranium and plutonium, as well as other radionuclides. The first stage since 1961, the second - since 1962. At the moment, the main activity of the chemical plant is the production of pure compounds of natural uranium (refining). 
Chemical-Metallurgical Plant (KMZ) - melting and processing of plutonium with the production of components for nuclear weapons and special items. Manufacture of magnetic alloys and magnets from them. Production of ultrafine powders.

See also 

 Nuclear power in Russia
 Mining and Chemical Combine - plutonium production plant using similar nuclear reactors
 Sibirskaya Nuclear Power Plant

References

External links
 Official website

Nuclear technology in Russia
Nuclear companies of Russia
Nuclear reprocessing sites
Companies based in Tomsk Oblast
Rosatom
Manufacturing companies of the Soviet Union
1953 establishments in Russia
Isotope separation facilities